Harold Bridges (30 June 1915 – 1989) was an English footballer, who played as an inside forward in the Football League for Tranmere Rovers.

References

External links

Tranmere Rovers F.C. players
Manchester City F.C. players
Witton Albion F.C. players
Association football inside forwards
English Football League players
1915 births
1989 deaths
English footballers